The 1941–42 La Liga was the 11th season of Spanish football league. Valencia won the first top-flight title in club history.

Team locations

Real Sociedad returned to the first division after a three-season absence. Granada, Deportivo La Coruña and Castellón made their debut in La Liga.

For this season, Hércules played with the denomination of Alicante CF. The namesake club acted as its reserve team with the name of Lucentum CF.

League table

Results

Relegation play-offs
Both matches were played at Estadio Chamartín in Chamartín de la Rosa.

|}

Top scorers

External links
LFP website

1941 1942
1941–42 in Spanish football leagues
Spain